Tireh (also Romanized as Tīreh) is a village in Duzaj Rural District, Kharqan District, Zarandieh County, Markazi Province, Iran. At the 2006 census, its population was 216, in 48 families.

References 

Populated places in Zarandieh County